The 1995 Base Realignment and Closure Commission preliminary list was released by the United States Department of Defense in 1995 as part of the Base Realignment and Closure Commission. It recommended closing 32 major United States military bases.

Commissioners

Alan J. Dixon, Chairman  
Alton W. Cornella 
Rebecca G. Cox
James B. Davis (general), USAF (Ret.)
S. Lee Kling 
RADM Benjamin F. Montoya, USN (Ret.)
MS Josue Robles, Jr., USA (Ret.)  
Wendi L. Steele

Justifications

The Department of Defense wanted to improve military readiness, as with previous BRAC rounds. All three of the BRAC rounds of the 1990s (1991, 1993, and 1995) were authorized under the same law, Public Law 101-510.

Recommendations
Major facilities slated for closure included:
Bergstrom Air Force Base
Camp Bonneville
Castle Air Force Base
Fitzsimons Army Medical Center
Fort Chaffee
Fort Greely
Fort Indiantown Gap
Fort McClellan
Fort Pickett
Fort Ritchie
Kelly Air Force Base
Letterkenny Army Depot
McClellan Air Force Base
Military Ocean Terminal at Bayonne
Naval Air Facility Adak
Naval Air Station South Weymouth
Naval Air Warfare Center Aircraft Division, Warminster
Naval Air Warfare Center, Aircraft Division, Indianapolis
Naval Shipyard, Long Beach
Naval Supply Center, Oakland
Naval Surface Warfare Center Crane Division
Naval Surface Warfare Center Dahlgren Division
Oakland Army Base
Ontario Air National Guard Station
Red River Army Depot
Reese Air Force Base
Roslyn Air National Guard Station
Savanna Army Depot Activity
Seneca Army Depot
Ship Repair Facility, Guam
Sierra Army Depot
Stratford Army Engine Plant

See also
 Loss of Strength Gradient

References

External links
1995 Base Realignment and Closure Commission recommendations
Department of the Army Analyses and Recommendations, Volume III
James Landrith Archive of 1995 DBCRC Report

1995 in the United States
Base Realignment and Closure Commission